The North Coast of California is located on the Pacific coast in between the San Francisco Bay and the Oregon border and includes Del Norte, Humboldt, Lake, and Mendocino counties.

This list of North Coast, California museums, defined for this context as institutions (in nonprofit organizations, government entities, and private businesses) that collect and care for objects of cultural, artistic, scientific, or historical interest and make their collections or related exhibits available for public viewing can include non-profit and university art galleries. Museums that exist only in cyberspace (i.e., virtual museums) are not included.

To use the sortable tables: click on the icons at the top of each column to sort that column in alphabetical order; click again for reverse alphabetical order.

Museums

Defunct museums
 Ship Ashore Gift Shop & Museum, Smith River

See also
List of museums in California

References

Humboldt